White Bronco is the fourth studio album by American rapper Action Bronson. The album was released on November 1, 2018, by the Action Bronson Corporation and Empire Distribution.

Singles
The album's first single "White Bronco" was released on September 21, 2018. The album's second single "Prince Charming" was released on October 19, 2018.

Critical reception

White Bronco received mixed reviews from critics. Phillip Mlynar of Pitchfork gave the album a 5.1 out of 10, saying "The 26-minute White Bronco, Bronson’s ninth full-length project, largely lacks the piquancy and depth that made him matter." Scott Glaysher of HipHopDX gave the album a 3.9 out of 5, saying "There is no denying that Bronson is one of Hip Hop’s most beloved characters and thankfully he continues to make strong songs and albums to back it up. With that said this album isn’t anything out of the ordinary for Bronson and might not be talked about or listened to this time next year."

Track listing

Charts

References

2018 albums
Action Bronson albums
Albums produced by Harry Fraud
Albums produced by Knxwledge
Albums produced by Daringer (producer)
Empire Distribution albums